Raphael Joseph Anthony MacGinty (born 22 March 1927) is an English former cricketer.  MacGinty was a right-handed batsman who bowled right-arm off break.  He was born at Croydon, Surrey.

In 1951, MacGinty made his Minor Counties Championship debut for Cambridgeshire against the Northamptonshire Second XI.  From 1951 to 1952, he represented the county in 7 Minor Counties matches, with his final appearance coming against Lincolnshire.

MacGinty also played first-class cricket for Cambridge University, making his first-class debut against Leicestershire in 1952.  He represented the University in 5 further first-class matches in 1952, with his final appearance coming against Gloucestershire.  In his 6 first-class matches, he took 17 wickets at a bowling average of 29.64, with best figures of 4/58.

References

External links
Raphael MacGinty at Cricinfo
Raphael MacGinty at CricketArchive

1927 births
Possibly living people
People from Croydon
People from Surrey
English cricketers
Cambridgeshire cricketers
Cambridge University cricketers
Alumni of the University of Cambridge